Eberhard Edzard van der Laan (28 June 1955 – 5 October 2017) was a Dutch politician who served as Minister for Housing, Communities and Integration from 2008 to 2010 and Mayor of Amsterdam from 2010 until his death in 2017. He was a member of the Labour Party (PvdA).

Van der Laan, a lawyer by occupation, worked for the Trenité Van Doorne Advocaten law firm from 1982 until 1992 when he co-founded the Kennedy Van der Laan law firm and served as a partner until 2008. After Ella Vogelaar—Minister for Housing, Communities and Integration in the Fourth Balkenende cabinet—resigned because the Leader of the Labour Party Wouter Bos lost his confidence in her position after increasing criticism on her performance, Van der Laan was asked to succeed her and took office on 14 November 2008. The Fourth Balkenende cabinet fell on 23 February 2010 as the result of disagreement between the Christian Democratic Appeal (CDA) and the Labour Party over the extension of ISAF mission in Afghanistan.

On 27 January 2017 it was revealed that Van der Laan had terminal lung cancer. On 18 September 2017 he published a letter entitled "Dear Amsterdammers", in which he revealed that all options of treatment had been exhausted and that with immediate effect he would take a leave of absence and the mayoral tasks would be taken up by Kajsa Ollongren. He died seventeen days later.

Early life
Van der Laan was born in Rijnsburg, a small town nearby Leiden. Van der Laan graduated in 1983 cum laude in law at the Vrije Universiteit Amsterdam. He co-founded the law firm of Kennedy Van der Laan.

Politics

Local politics
Van der Laan began his  political career as assistant to Amsterdam alderman Jan Schaefer. From 1990-98 he was a member of the Amsterdam municipal council, from 1993 as the chair of the Labour Party group. After leaving politics he became a full-time lawyer.

National politics
In 2006 he was informateur in the negotiations of the new Amsterdam college van burgemeester en wethouders. In the local elections, politicians were criticized by Van der Laan for distributing election leaflets in minority languages and in some cases leaflets were collected. On 14 November 2008 he succeeded Ella Vogelaar as Minister for Housing, Communities and Integration in the Fourth cabinet Balkenende. On 23 June 2010 he was nominated by the Amsterdam municipal council to become Mayor of Amsterdam; the nomination was accepted by the King's Commissioner of North Holland.

Death 
On 27 January 2017 it was revealed that Van der Laan had metastatic lung cancer. He died on 5 October 2017 from this disease at the age of 62.

Decorations

References

External links

Official
  Mr. E.E. (Eberhard) van der Laan Parlement & Politiek

1955 births
2017 deaths
Deaths from cancer in the Netherlands
Deaths from lung cancer
Dutch jurists
Dutch republicans
Dutch political consultants
Dutch speechwriters
Labour Party (Netherlands) politicians
Mayors of Amsterdam
Ministers without portfolio of the Netherlands
Municipal councillors of Amsterdam
Officers of the Order of Orange-Nassau
Reformed Churches Christians from the Netherlands
People from Leiden
Vrije Universiteit Amsterdam alumni
20th-century Dutch lawyers
20th-century Dutch politicians
21st-century Dutch lawyers
21st-century Dutch politicians